A Kalashnikov (Калашников) rifle is any one of a series of automatic rifles based on the original design of Mikhail Kalashnikov. They are officially known in Russian as "Avtomát Kaláshnikova", but are widely known as Kalashnikovs, AKs, or in Russian slang, a "Kalash". They were originally manufactured in the Soviet Union, primarily by Kalashnikov Concern, formerly Izhmash, but these rifles and their variants are now manufactured in many other countries. The Kalashnikov is one of the most widely used guns in the world, with an estimated 72 million rifles in global circulation.

Types 
The original Kalashnikov rifles and their derivatives, as produced in the Soviet Union and later the Russian Federation.

Variants
Original AK variants (7.62×39mm)
 Issue of 1948/49 – The very earliest models, with the Type 1 stamped sheet metal receiver, are now very rare.
 Issue of 1951 – Type 2: Has a milled receiver. Barrel and chamber are chrome plated to resist corrosion.
 Issue of 1954/55 – Type 3: Lightened milled receiver variant.
 AKS – Featured a downward-folding metal stock similar to that of the German MP40, for use in the restricted space in the BMP infantry combat vehicle, as well as by paratroops.
 AKN (AKSN) – Night scope rail.

Modernized (7.62×39mm)
AKM – A simplified, lighter version of the AK-47; Type 4 receiver is made from stamped and riveted sheet metal. A slanted muzzle device was added to counter climb in automatic fire. Rifle weight is  due to the lighter receiver. This is the most ubiquitous variant of the AK-47.
AKMS – Under-folding stock version of the AKM intended for airborne troops.
 AKMN (AKMSN) – Night scope rail (Scope rail and folding stock)
 AKML (AKMSL) – Slotted flash suppressor (Flash suppressor and folding stock)
RPK – Hand-held machine gun version with longer barrel and bipod. The variants – RPKS, RPKN (RPKSN), RPKL (RPKSL) – mirror AKM variants. The "S" variants have a side-folding wooden stock.

Low-impulse variants (5.45×39mm)

AK-74 – Assault rifle.
 AKS-74 – Side-folding stock.
 AK-74N (AKS-74N) – Night scope rail.
AKS-74U 'Krinkov' – Compact carbine. 
 AKS-74UN – Night scope rail.
RPK-74 – Light machine gun.
 RPKS-74 – Side-folding stock.
 RPK-74N (RPKS-74N) – Night scope rail.

The AK-100 Series

5.45×39mm / 5.56×45mm / 7.62×39mm
AK-74M / AK-101 / AK-103 – Modernized AK-74. Scope rail and side-folding stock.
AK-105 / AK-102 / AK-104 – Carbine.
AK-107 / AK-108 / AK-109 – Balanced recoil models.
RPK-74M / RPK-201 / RPKM (A.K.A. RPK-203) – Light machine guns.
AK-9 – 9×39mm compact assault rifle, usually equipped with a suppressor.

The AK-12 series

5.45×39mm / 7.62×39mm / 5.56×45mm / 7.62×51mm
AK-12 / AK-15 / AK-19 / AK-308 – A new AK family derivative based on the AK-400 prototype. Accepted as main service rifle in January 2018.
 AK-12K / AK-15K – Carbine.
 RPK-16 – Squad automatic weapon, based on the AK-12.

The AK-200 Series
 
5.45×39mm / 5.56×45mm / 7.62×39mm
AK-200 / AK-201 / AK-203 - Rifle. AK-12 evolved into AK-12, see above. AK-203 is intended for Indian army.
AK-205 / AK-202 / AK-204 - Carbine.

Other weapons

PK(M) – 7.62×54mmR general-purpose machine gun.
PKP Pecheneg – machine gun
Saiga-12 – 12-gauge shotgun. Built on AK receiver.
 Saiga-12S – Pistol grip and side-folding stock.
 Saiga-12K – Shorter barrel.
 KSK shotgun – 12-gauge combat shotgun (based on Saiga-12).
 Saiga-20 (S/K) – 20-gauge.
 Saiga-410 (S/K) – .410 bore.
Saiga semi-automatic rifle
Vepr-12 Molot – 12-gauge combat shotgun. Built on RPK receiver.
Bizon – Submachine gun with helical magazine. Borrows 60% of details from AKS-74U. 9×18mm PM, 9×19mm Luger, .380 ACP; 7.62×25mm TT (box magazine).
Vityaz-SN – Submachine gun. 9×19mm Parabellum.
Saiga-9 is a semi automatic civilian carbine chambered in 9×19mm Parabellum and is based on the PP-19 produced by Kalashnikov.
OTs-14 Groza – Bullpup assault rifle. 9×39mm, 7.62×39mm.
 Galil ACE – Multi-purpose assault rifle, based on the Galil, which was itself based on the Finnish RK 62

Production
The rifle's simple design makes it easy to produce, and the Soviet Union readily leased plans of the firearm to friendly countries, where it could be produced locally at a low cost. As a result, the Kalashnikov rifles and their variants have been manufactured in many countries, with and without licenses. Manufacturing countries in alphabetical order include:

Similar rifles
The following rifles were either based on the Kalashnikov design, or have a different design but are superficially similar in appearance:

 FARA 83 (Argentina)
BD-08 (Bangladesh)
AR-M1 (Bulgaria)
Type 56, Type 81 (China)
Vz. 58 (Czechoslovakia)
RK 62 (also called Valmet M76, Rk 62 76 or M62/76), Valmet M78 (light machine gun), RK 95 TP (Finland)
AK-63, AMD-65 (Hungary)
INSAS rifle (India)
IMI Galil, IWI ACE (Israel)
Bernardelli VB-STD/VB-SR (Italy)
 FB Beryl, FB Tantal (Poland)
 Pistol Mitralieră model 1963/1965 (Romania)
 Zastava M70 (Serbia, Yugoslavia)
 Zastava M21 (Serbia)
Vektor R4, Truvelo Raptor (South Africa)
 MPi-KM (East Germany)
 MPi-KMS-72 (East Germany)

See also
 PBS-1 silencer

Notes

The Kalashnikov weapon design has become increasingly more popular in the American firearms industry. There are specific competitive shooting matches that require the use of its weapon variants like the Red Oktober match held just outside of St. George, Utah. It is a match designed for the use of ComBloc style weapons, but the Kalashnikov design is extremely heavy within the participants' arsenals.

References

Citations

Sources

External links 
 

 
Assault rifles
Assault rifles of the Soviet Union
Infantry weapons of the Cold War
Rifles of the Cold War
Soviet inventions